Donald Alan Diamond (June 4, 1921 – June 19, 2011) was an American radio, film, and television actor who portrayed "Crazy Cat", the sidekick and heir apparent to Chief Wild Eagle on the popular 1960s television sitcom, F Troop (1965–1967). He also co-starred as "El Toro", the sidekick of Bill Williams' main character of Kit Carson in 105 episodes of the popular early television series, The Adventures of Kit Carson, from 1951 to 1955 .

Early years
Don Diamond was born in New York City on June 4, 1921. His father, Benjamin, emigrated to the United States from Russia in 1906 with his parents. Benjamin Diamond served in the United States Army in World War I and then became a prosperous clothing merchant. Benjamin and Ruth Diamond had another son, Neal, three years younger than Don.

Diamond graduated from the University of Michigan, wiah a degree in drama supplemented by studies in Spanish. He then enlisted in the United States Army Air Corps. He studied Spanish further while he was stationed in the Southwest.

Career 
Discharged in 1946 as a first lieutenant, he began acting on radio and became known for his dialect portrayals of Spaniards and Mexicans. He played El Toro  in The Adventures of Kit Carson syndicated television series (1951–1955). Diamond also played Corporal Reyes on the Walt Disney television series Zorro and Crazy Cat on F Troop. In 1968, Diamond appeared as Diego on The Big Valley in the episode titled "Miranda." 

He appeared on more than 100 television shows and in many feature films. He performed extensive voice-over work in commercials and cartoons, most notably as the voice of Toro in the DePatie-Freleng Enterprises cartoon series Tijuana Toads.

On radio, Diamond was heard on the NBC crime drama Confession.

Death
Diamond died due to heart failure in Los Angeles, California, on June 19, 2011, at age 90.

Personal
His wife, Louisa, was a teacher.

Filmography

References

External links

Obituary in Los Angeles Times

1921 births
2011 deaths
American male film actors
United States Army Air Forces personnel of World War II
American people of Russian descent
American male radio actors
American male television actors
Male actors from New York City
United States Army Air Forces officers
University of Michigan School of Music, Theatre & Dance alumni
Yiddish-speaking people
20th-century American male actors
American male voice actors
People from Brooklyn
Western (genre) television actors